Ivan Bisyuk is a Ukrainian politician. He has held the positions of First Deputy Minister of Agrarian Policy and Food and chairman of Agrarian Party of Ukraine.

Biography 

Ivan Bisyuk was born January 3, 1962, in Maly Rozhyn (Kosiv Raion, Ivano-Frankivsk Oblast, Ukrainian SSR).

References

External links 
 Biography on the official website of the Agrarian Party of Ukraine
 Biography on "Who is Who in Ukraine"

Ukrainian politicians
1962 births
Living people
People from Ivano-Frankivsk Oblast